Aukerman is a surname. Notable people with the surname include:

James V. Aukerman (born 1948), American lawyer
Milo Aukerman (born 1963), American singer and songwriter
Russell Aukerman, 19th-century American football player and coach
Scott Aukerman (born 1970), American actor, writer, television personality and podcast host

See also
 Aukerman, Ohio
 Aukerman Creek